Mojave Desert News is a newspaper published in California City, California. Named after the Mojave Desert, it reports on news in Kern County. Founded in 1938, it claims to be the longest-running newspaper in the east of the county.

References

External links

Newspapers published in California
Mass media in Kern County, California
Mojave, California
History of Kern County, California
History of the Mojave Desert region
Newspapers established in 1938
1938 establishments in California
California City, California